The Baie du Canot Rouge is a bay of the Taureau Reservoir, in the unorganized territory of Baie-de-la-Bouteille, in the Matawinie Regional County Municipality (MRC), in the administrative region of Lanaudière, in Quebec, in Canada.

From the middle of 19th century, forestry was the predominant economic activity in the sector. From 20th century, recreational tourism activities were highlighted. This body of water is very famous for pleasure boating.

The lake's surface is generally frozen from November to April; however, safe circulation on the ice is usually from mid-December to the end of March.

Geography 
This bay is located at the western limit of the Mastigouche Wildlife Reserve.

The bay receives on its west shore the waters of René stream and from the east, the outlet of Lac de la Pomme.

Toponymy

The toponym "Baie du Canot Rouge" was formalized on December 5, 1968 at the Place Names Bank of the Commission de toponymie du Québec.

See also 
 Taurus Reservoir
 Lac Taureau Regional Park
 Matawinie Regional County Municipality
 Baie-de-la-Bouteille, unorganized territory
 Mastigouche Wildlife Reserve
 Ruisseau du Canot Rouge (Matawinie), a tributary of Taurus Reservoir
 Matawin River

Notes and references 

Bays of Quebec
Landforms of Lanaudière